The following lists events that happened during 1999 in Chile.

Incumbents
President of Chile: Eduardo Frei Ruiz-Tagle

Events

December
12 December – Presidential elections are held in Chile, resulting in a runoff on 16 January 2000.

Deaths
9 April – Raúl Silva Henríquez (b. 1907)
18 April – Enrique Hormazábal (b. 1931)
29 September – Gustavo Leigh (b. 1920)

References 

 
Years of the 20th century in Chile
Chile